Soccer Bowl '84, also known as Soccer Bowl Series '84, was the championship of the 1984 NASL season, and the last championship of the original NASL. In a departure from previous years, it was a best-of-three series between the Chicago Sting and the Toronto Blizzard as opposed to a single-game championship. The first game of the series was held on Monday, October 1 at Comiskey Park, in Chicago, Illinois; the Sting won it, 2–1.  The second game was played at Varsity Stadium, in Toronto, Ontario on October 3. Chicago won again, this time by a score of 3–2, to sweep the series and claim its second North American championship.

Background

Chicago Sting
The Chicago Sting finished the regular season with a 13-11 record, while the Blizzard went 14-10. However, due to the NASL's point system, the Sting were crowned the Eastern Division champions, and also won the league's regular season title with 120 points. This ensured that they would retain home field advantage throughout the playoffs. Since all series were best-of-three ties, that meant a Game 3 if necessary, would be in Chicago. The Sting defeated the Vancouver Whitecaps in their semi-finals series, two games to one.

Toronto Blizzard
The Toronto Blizzard qualified for the playoffs as runners-up in the Eastern Division and faced the San Diego Sockers in the other semi-final series. The Blizzard earned a return trip to the finals with a two–game sweep of the Western Division champion Sockers. Games 1 and 3 of the Soccer Bowl Series were scheduled to be played at Comiskey Park, while game 2 was set for Toronto's Varsity Stadium.

Sportsvision televised the series in the Chicago area; this coverage was simulcast on the then-new TSN (which had started up a month earlier) cable channel in Canada.

Series summary 

Notes

Match details

Game 1

Game 2 

1984 NASL Champions: Chicago Sting

Championship Statistics

Post-match controversy
Earlier in the year Sting ownership had requested a one-year leave of absence from the NASL, and were denied.  With only a few games remaining in the season, Sting chairman Lee Stern, believing that indoor soccer represented the future of the sport, announced that 1984 would be the Chicago Sting's last in the NASL. They, along with three other teams had been granted full admittance to the MISL. The Blizzard, who were run by former Sting president Clive Toye, were one of the franchises fighting to keep the NASL going.

In the immediate aftermath of Chicago's title clinching victory, Toye's actions and subsequent words were unsporting in nature. He refused to honor the long-standing tradition of entering the winning side's locker room to congratulate the victors. He then followed that up by taking verbal jabs at both Willy Roy and Karl-Heinz Granitza to reporters, by referring to them as "cheats" and the Sting as "unworthy champions" among other things. While in the midst of Chicago's post match celebration, not surprisingly, Granitza responded in kind. In the end the pettiness and lack of sportsmanship by both men mattered little, as Chicago left with the league's final trophy. The following spring, with Toye as the NASL's interim president, the league would cease operations.

See also 
 1984 North American Soccer League season

References

External links
 Video of the games (pt 1a, 1b, 2a, 2b, 2c)

1984
 
1984 in Canadian soccer
1984
Toronto Blizzard matches
1984 in sports in Illinois
1984 in Toronto
1980s in Chicago
Soccer in Chicago
Soccer in Toronto
Sports competitions in Chicago
Sports competitions in Toronto
October 1984 sports events in Canada
October 1984 sports events in the United States